D&F Estates Ltd v Church Commissioners for England and Wales [1989] AC 177; [1988] 2 All ER 992 was a landmark House of Lords judgment in English law which restricted the duty of care in negligence to cases of physical damage and injury rather than pure economic loss.

Facts
The Church Commissioners owned a block of flats built by a firm of contractors. The plastering work was sub contracted. Fifteen years after the property was built it was found that the plastering work was defective. As there was no direct contractual relationship between the plaintiff and the defendants an action was brought in tort.

The judge found that all the plaster applied to concrete surfaces was defective because the sub-contractors, using a particular plaster then newly on the market called "Gyplite,"  had failed to follow the manufacturers' instructions. They should have applied one coat of bonding plaster and one coat of finishing plaster, but instead had interposed a coat of browning plaster (the older time-consuming and less effective method due to the time required for drying) and it was this that in due course caused plaster, which should have remained sound for the lifetime of the building, to lose its key and require replacement. He said:

Judgment

Court of Appeal
Court of Appeal found that as the contractor had employed a competent sub contractor, therefore no duty of care was owed.

House of Lords
The House of Lords also held that damages were not recoverable in tort.

See also
Pure economic loss in English law

Notes

External links
D & F Estates v Church Commissioners for England

English tort case law
Pure economic loss case law
House of Lords cases
1988 in case law
1988 in British law